Lincoln Township is one of the twenty-one townships of Tama County, Iowa, United States.

History
Lincoln Township was established in 1861. It was originally built up chiefly by Germans.

References

Townships in Tama County, Iowa
Townships in Iowa
1861 establishments in Iowa